The R328 is a Regional Route in Western Cape, South Africa that connects Mossel Bay in the south to Prince Albert in the north via Oudtshoorn.

Route
Its northern origin is a junction with the R407 just south of Prince Albert. It heads south, approaching the Swartberg Mountains and it enters the Swartberg Pass. On the other side, it veers east-south-east. It gives off a short northern road to the Cango Caves just before turning south. It then heads south into the Schoemanspoort Pass. On the other side, it continues south to Oudtshoorn. At Oudtshoorn, it meets an intersection with the N12 and R62 and it becomes co-signed with the R62 westwards. Just outside the town, the route diverges from the R62 and continues in a southerly direction. It crosses the Outeniqua mountains at Robinson Pass to reach its terminus at a junction with the R102 at Hartenbos, just north of Mossel Bay.

External links
 Routes Travel Info
 Schoemanspoort Pass
 Robertson Pass
 :fr:Robinson Pass

References

Regional Routes in the Western Cape